Antonio Maria Haffner (1654–1732) was an Italian painter of quadratura and priest during the Baroque period, active mainly in Bologna.

Biography
Enrico was born to a Swiss father, who was a mercenary Swiss guard for the Papacy, stationed in Bologna; Enrico himself rose to become a lieutenant in the force. 
Along with his older brother Enrico Haffner (born 1640), they initially trained in the studio of Domenico Maria Canuti, but soon gravitated to quadratura,

Antonio traveled to Rome with his brother and Canuti. After returning to Bologna, he traveled in 1676 to Genoa. He lived there for the rest of his life, entering the Congregation of the Oratory of St Phillip Neri. The order was supportive of his work as a painter.

References

1654 births
1732 deaths
17th-century Italian painters
Italian male painters
18th-century Italian painters
Painters from Bologna
Painters from Genoa
Italian Baroque painters
18th-century Italian male artists